Nanzhao County is a county under the jurisdiction of Nanyang City, in the southwest of Henan province, China, has an area of  and a population of 600,000 as of 2002.

Administrative divisions
As 2012, this county is divided to 8 towns and 8 townships.
Towns

Townships

Climate

Transportation
China National Highway 305

References

External links
Official website of Nanzhao County Government
Nanzhao Nanyang City, Henan Province, China

 
County-level divisions of Henan
Nanyang, Henan